A bō (棒: ぼう), bong (Korean), pang (Cantonese), bang (Mandarin), or kun (Okinawan) is a staff weapon used in Okinawa.

Types
The bō is usually made with unfinished (no varnish, stain, etc) hard wood or a flexible wood, such as red or white oak, although bamboo and pine wood have been used; more common still is rattan wood for its flexibility. The modern bō may be tapered in that it can be thicker in the center (chukon-bu) than at the ends (kontei) and is usually round or circular (maru-bo). Some bō are very light, with metallic sides, stripes and a grip which are used for XMA and competitions/demonstrations. Older bō were round (maru-bo), square (kaku-bo) (rokkaku-bo) or octagonal (hakkaku-bo).

A  bō is sometimes called a rokushakubō (六尺棒: ろくしゃくぼう). This name derives from the Japanese words roku (六: ろく), meaning "six"; shaku (尺: しゃく); and bō. The shaku is a Japanese measurement equivalent to 30.3 centimeters (0.994 ft). Thus, rokushakubō refers to a staff about 6-shaku (1.82 m; 5.96 feet) long. The bō is typically 3 cm (1.25 inch) thick, sometimes gradually tapering from the middle (chukon-bu) to 2 cm (0.75 inch)at the end (kontei). This thickness allows the user to make a tight fist around it in order to block and counter an attack.

In some cases for training purposes or for a different style, rattan was used. Some were inlaid or banded with strips of iron or other metals for extra strength. Bō range from heavy to light, from rigid to highly flexible, and from simple pieces of wood picked up from the side of the road to ornately decorated works of art.

Martial arts

The Japanese martial art of wielding the bō is bōjutsu. The basis of bō technique is te, or hand, techniques derived from quanfa and other martial arts that reached Okinawa via trade and Chinese monks. Thrusting, swinging, and striking techniques often resemble empty-hand movements, following the philosophy that the bō is merely an "extension of one’s limbs". Consequently, bōjutsu is often incorporated into other styles of empty hand fighting, such as karate. The "bō" is also used as a spear and long sword in some of its motions, such as upward swing and slashing motion across the body as well as extensions by gripping one end and thus increasing its length as thus making it similar to a spear.

The bō is typically gripped in thirds, and when held horizontally in front, the right palm is facing away from the body and the left hand is facing the body, enabling the staff to rotate. The power is generated by the back hand pulling the staff, while the front hand is used for guidance. Bō technique includes a wide variety of blocks, strikes, sweeps, and entrapments.

History

The earliest form of the bō, a staff, has been used throughout Asia since the beginning of recorded history. These were hard to make and were often unreliable. These were also extremely heavy. The konsaibo was a very distant variant of the kanabo. They were made from wood studded with iron. These were still too cumbersome for actual combat, so they were later replaced by unmodified hardwood staffs. Used for self-defense by monks or commoners, the staff was an integral part of the Tenshin Shōden Katori Shintō-ryū, one of the martial arts oldest surviving styles. The staff evolved into the bō with the foundation of kobudō, a martial art using weapons, which emerged in Okinawa in the early 17th century.

Prior to the 15th century, Okinawa, a small island located south of Japan, was divided into three kingdoms: Chuzan, Hokuzan, and Nanzan. After much political turmoil, Okinawa was united under the Sho Dynasty in 1429. In 1477, Emperor Sho Shin came into power. Determined to enforce his philosophical and ethical ideas, while banning feudalism, the emperor instituted a ban on weapons. It became a crime to carry or own weapons such as swords, in an attempt to prevent further turmoil and prevent an uprising.

In 1609, the temporary peace established by Sho Shin was violently overthrown when the powerful Shimazu clan of Satsuma invaded and conquered Okinawa. The Shimazu lords placed a new weapons ban, leaving the Okinawans defenseless against samurai weaponry. In an attempt to protect themselves, the people of Okinawa looked to simple farming implements, which the samurai would not be able to confiscate, as new methods of defense. This use of weapons developed into kobudo, or "ancient martial way" as known today.

Although the bō is now used as a weapon, its use is believed by some to have evolved from the long stick (tenbin) which was used to balance buckets or baskets. Typically, one would carry baskets of harvested crops or buckets of water or fish, etc., one at each end of the tenbin, which is balanced across the middle of the back at the shoulder blades. In poorer agrarian economies, the tenbin remains a traditional farm work implement. In styles such as Yamanni-ryū or Kenshin-ryū, many of the strikes are the same as those used for yari ("spear") or naginata ("glaive").

Gallery

Popular culture
 Teenage Mutant Ninja Turtles features bo staffs being the primary weapons of Donatello. Sometimes, they were used by Leonardo and Miyamoto Usagi in the 2003 version.
 Power Rangers Jungle Fury features the Jungle Bo used by Lily Chilman, the Yellow Cheetah Ranger.
 Ninjago features the bō as the weapon of sensei Wu during both incarnations of the animation and was the weapon of choice of Lord Garmadon during his period as Sensei Garmadon (during the third season Ninjago: Rebooted and fourth season Ninjago: Tournament of Elements)
 Tim Drake, the third Robin — partner, and sidekick to Batman — uses a collapsible bo staff as his weapon of choice.
 Napoleon Dynamite's eponymous nerd imagines himself to be "pretty good with a bo staff."
 Darth Maul's trademark dual bladed lightsaber is effectively a light-bō, which he wields as such.

See also

Bōjutsu
Budō
Gun (staff)
Hanbō
Jō
Kanabō
List of martial arts weapons
Okinawan kobudō
Quarterstaff
Stick-fighting
Tambo
Yubi-bo
Ruyi Jingu Bang
Donatello
Jade
Gambit

References

External links

 Martialarm.com
 Koryu.com

Weapons of Okinawa
Japanese martial arts terminology
Samurai staff weapons
Staff weapons of Japan
Non-lethal weapons

nn:Bo
sv:Japanska stavvapen#Bo